Turkey and Monaco established diplomatic relations in 1954 and since then have enjoyed excellent relations, which both countries seek to maintain and strengthen.

Historical relations 
Historically, Monaco's foreign relations with Turkey were limited due to the Franco-Monégasque Treaty, which required Monaco to refrain from conducting a foreign policy in exchange for France's defense of Monégasque independence and sovereignty.

In 2005, Monaco renegotiated the 1918 Franco-Monégasque Treaty to allow full direct diplomatic relations between Monaco and other countries. Taking advantage of the updated treaty, in 2006, Turkey and Monaco established full diplomatic relations.

The Turkish consulate-general in Marseille is accredited to Monaco since September 16, 2008 and handles most diplomatic and working-level contacts with Monaco.

Presidential visits

Trade Relations 
Trade volume between the two countries was 12.8 million EUR in 2015 (Turkish exports/imports: 6.9/5.9 million EUR).

See also 

 Foreign relations of Monaco
 Foreign relations of Turkey

References 

 
Turkey
Bilateral relations of Turkey